Archibald Berdmore Brine Buchanan (9 January 1823  – 30 March 1883)  was both a member of the Queensland Legislative Council and the Queensland Legislative Assembly.

Early life
Buchanan was born in London, England in 1823 to William and Charlotte Buchanan. On his arrival in Australia, He became a partner in a general store in Taradale, Victoria before moving to Queensland and leasing Chinchilla and Wongongera stations on the Darling Downs. In the early 1870s he became a director at Queensland National Bank.

Politics

Entering politics in 1870, Buchanan won the seat of Mitchell but resigned after being a member for only six or seven days. In 1871, Buchanan won the seat of Warrego, and remained in the position for two years.

In 1874, Buchanan was appointed to the Queensland Legislative Council. Buchanan held the seat until 1878.

Later life
After resigning his seat in the Council, Buchanan he left for England to establish the London branch of the Queensland National Bank. He did not return to Queensland, dying in Rome, Italy, on 30 March 1883.

References

Members of the Queensland Legislative Assembly
Members of the Queensland Legislative Council
1823 births
1883 deaths
19th-century Australian politicians